Telodeinopus is a genus of giant African millipedes in family Spirostreptidae, containing eight species:
 Telodeinopus assiniensis (Attems, 1914)
 Telodeinopus bibundinus (Attems, 1914)
 Telodeinopus chapini (Chamberlin, 1927)
 Telodeinopus eidmanni Verhoeff, 1941
 Telodeinopus exilis (Attems, 1934)
 Telodeinopus lanceolatus (Demange, 1965)
 Telodeinopus sulcatus (Voges, 1878)
 Telodeinopus variabilis (Cook & Collins, 1893)

References

Spirostreptida
Millipedes of Africa